Tyler Ray Weiman (born June 5, 1984) is a Canadian former professional ice hockey goaltender. He played one game in the National Hockey League (NHL) with the Colorado Avalanche.

Playing career

Weiman was born in Saskatoon, Saskatchewan. He was drafted 164th overall in the 2002 NHL Entry Draft by the Colorado Avalanche. He was drafted from the Tri-City Americans of the Western Hockey League and played for four years before leaving for the CHL where he won a Presidents Cup with the Colorado Eagles in 2005.

He made his professional debut in the 2005–06 season with Avalanche affiliate, the Lowell Lock Monsters of the AHL, and finished the season with the San Diego Gulls of the ECHL. In the 2006–07 season Tyler established himself as the starting keeper for the Albany River Rats.

Weiman started the 2007–08 season with the Colorado Avalanche after injury to José Théodore, and made his NHL debut on October 4, 2007, against the Nashville Predators in relief of starting goalie, Peter Budaj. He was then sent to new affiliate, the Lake Erie Monsters of the AHL, for the remainder of the season.

Weiman re-signed with the Avalanche to a one-year, two-way deal on July 14, 2008. He returned to Lake Erie for the 2008–09 season and performed strongly, appearing in the AHL All-Star game. He finished the season leading the AHL in shutouts (8) and leading the Monsters in wins (21).

In the 2009–10 season, Weiman was recalled from his starting position with the Monsters, to the Avalanche to briefly serve as Craig Anderson's backup when Peter Budaj was quarantined from the team after being diagnosed with the H1N1 virus on October 27, 2009. Weiman received his second call for the season after Anderson was injured in the December 2 game against the Florida Panthers late in overtime. He sat on the bench as Budaj's backup for four games.

On July 12, 2010, Weiman left the Avalanche and signed a one-year contract as a free agent with the Vancouver Canucks, and was later assigned to AHL affiliate, the Manitoba Moose, for the duration of the 2010–11 season.

On July 25, 2011, Weiman signed a one-year contract with European team, Augsburger Panther of the DEL. Weimen quickly established himself as one of the stand-out goalies in the German league, earning a two-year contract with the Nürnberg Ice Tigers of the DEL on March 28, 2012.

After two successful seasons with Thomas Sabo, Weiman opted to leave as a free agent and signed a one-year contract with DEL2 club, EV Landshut on July 11, 2014. After spending the following 2015–16 season in Italy with HC Pustertal Wölfe of the Serie A, Weiman continued his journeyman career in agreeing to a one-year deal with new Asia League entrant from South Korea, Daemyung Killer Whales on August 19, 2016.

Personal
Weiman is a son-in-law of Simon Sochatsky, who is a former member of the Edmonton Investors Group (EIG), which owned the Edmonton Oilers.

Career statistics

Regular season and playoffs

See also
List of players who played only one game in the NHL

References

External links

1984 births
Albany River Rats players
Augsburger Panther players
Colorado Avalanche draft picks
Colorado Avalanche players
Colorado Eagles players
Daemyung Killer Whales players
EV Landshut players
Ice hockey people from Alberta
Ice hockey people from Saskatchewan
Lake Erie Monsters players
Living people
Lowell Lock Monsters players
Manitoba Moose players
HC Pustertal Wölfe players
San Diego Gulls (ECHL) players
Sportspeople from Saskatoon
Thomas Sabo Ice Tigers players
Tri-City Americans players
Canadian ice hockey goaltenders